Leukemia Research may refer to:

Leukemia Research (journal), a scientific journal
Blood Cancer UK, previously known as Leukaemia & Lymphoma Research and as Leukaemia Research, a research organization